"Cha Cha Cha" is a song by Finnish rapper/singer Käärijä, released on 17 January 2023. The song is set to represent Finland in the Eurovision Song Contest 2023 after winning  2023, the Finnish national selection for that year's Eurovision Song Contest.

Eurovision Song Contest

2023 
The competition consisted of a final on 25 February 2023, where seven entries competed. The winner was selected by a combination of public votes (75%) and seven international jury groups from Australia, Germany, Poland, Spain, Sweden, Ukraine and the United Kingdom (25%). The viewers had a total of 882 points to award, while the juries had a total of 294 points to award. Each jury group distributed their points as follows: 2, 4, 6, 8, 10 and 12 points. The viewer vote was based on the percentage of votes each song achieved through telephone, SMS and app voting.

"Cha Cha Cha" was drawn to perform third in the final. In the days leading up to the final, the song was considered a heavy favorite to win the contest, winning polls on various Eurovision fansites. During the voting in the final, it was revealed that the song had received 72 jury points and 467 televoting points, earning a total of 539 points, winning by a margin of 387 points. As a result of its victor, the song is scheduled to represent Finland at the Eurovision Song Contest 2023.

When asked why he believed he won, Käärijä stated that the uniqueness of both the song and the performance may have assisted in winning by a wide margin, saying "UMK has never seen a song or performance like this before...  you can go far even if you are not the most skilled singer or rapper."

At Eurovision 
According to Eurovision rules, all nations with the exceptions of the host country and the "Big Five" (France, Germany, Italy, Spain and the United Kingdom) are required to qualify from one of two semi-finals in order to compete for the final; the top ten countries from each semi-final progress to the final. The European Broadcasting Union (EBU) split up the competing countries into six different pots based on voting patterns from previous contests, with countries with favourable voting histories put into the same pot. On 31 January 2023, an allocation draw was held, which placed each country into one of the two semi-finals, and determined which half of the show they would perform in. Finland has been placed into the first semi-final, to be held on 9 May 2023, and has been scheduled to perform in the second half of the show.

Charts

References 

2023 songs
2023 singles
Eurovision songs of 2023
Eurovision songs of Finland
Number-one singles in Finland